Hernán Eduardo de Solminihać Tampier (born 11 January 1958 in Puerto Montt) is a Chilean engineer, academic, researcher, consultant and former Minister of State of President Sebastián Piñera's first government. He is the current director of Pontificia Universidad Católica de Chile Department of Engineering and Construction Management. He is also a member of football team Club Deportivo Universidad Católica director board as well as from sports channel CDF too.

He is of Croatian descent.

References

1958 births
Living people
Chilean people
Chilean people of Croatian descent
Government ministers of Chile
Pontifical Catholic University of Chile alumni